The Joy Device is an original novel by Justin Richards  featuring the fictional archaeologist Bernice Summerfield. The book is part of the New Adventures series, a spin-off from the long-running British science fiction television series Doctor Who.

1999 British novels
1999 science fiction novels
Virgin New Adventures
Novels by Justin Richards